Ilit (Iiliit) is a divergent variety of Kunama that is mutually unintelligible enough to be considered a distinct language. It is spoken by the Kunama people who straddle the western Eritrean–Ethiopian border.

References

Kunama languages
Languages of Eritrea